Telstar 19V (Telstar 19 Vantage) is a communication satellite in the Telstar series of the Canadian satellite communications company Telesat. It was built by Space Systems Loral (MAXAR) and is based on the SSL-1300 bus. The satellite was designed to provide additional capacity over the North Atlantic region. As of 26 July 2018, Telstar 19V is the heaviest commercial communications satellite ever launched, weighing at 7,076 kg (15,600 lbs) and surpassing the previous record, set by TerreStar-1 (6,910 kg/15230lbs), launched by Ariane 5ECA on 1 July 2009.

Launch
Telstar 19V was launched on a SpaceX Falcon 9 Block 5 rocket into geostationary transfer orbit (GTO) from Space Launch Complex 40 (SLC40) at Cape Canaveral Air Force Station, Space Coast, Florida, United States, on 22 July 2018 at 1:50 AM EDT (5:50 UTC). The rocket core landed on the autonomous spaceport drone ship about eight and a half minutes after liftoff.

References

External links
 SpaceX,  (22 July 2018) -- SpaceX launch coverage

Telstar satellites
Satellites using the SSL 1300 bus
Spacecraft launched in 2018
SpaceX commercial payloads
2018 in Canada
Communications satellites in geostationary orbit